Jabaquara is one of 96 districts in the city of São Paulo, Brazil.
The name Jabaquara comes from tupi-guarani YAB-A-QUAR-A, which means rock or hole.

References

Districts of São Paulo